The 1906 Colorado Silver and Gold football team was an American football team that represented the University of Colorado during the 1906 college football season. The team returned to the Colorado Football Association (CFL) after a season as an independent. Led by first-year head coach Frank Castleman, Colorado compiled an overall record of 2–3–4 with a mark of 1–1–2 in conference play, tying for second place in the CFA.

Schedule

References

Colorado
Colorado Buffaloes football seasons
Colorado Silver and Gold football